Roza Terenzi is the alias of Katie Campbell, an Australian DJ and music producer. Originally from Perth, she moved to Melbourne in 2017 and released her debut album as Roza Terenzi in January 2020.

Career 
Growing up, Katie Campbell played piano, drums and guitar. Her father produced electronic music in his studio during the 90s, and they began collaborating when she was nine years old. They released one song Clap to the Crap Rap, credited to KayTee.

Both parents supported Katie to study at the Western Australian Academy of the Performing Arts. It was there she became more influenced by electronic music such as Aphex Twin and Venetian Snares, and she began performing under the name Catlips.

After releasing her Casual EP in 2015 as Catlips, Katie created a new alias Roza Terenzi in 2016, in reference to Italian astrophysicist and musician Fiorella Terenzi. In 2019 she debuted a new alias Gloworm.

As Roza Terenzi, Katie has released several singles and EPs, and toured around the world and performed at Meredith and Primavera festivals. In 2020 she released Modern Bliss, the debut Roza Terenzi album.

Pitchfork gave Modern Bliss 7/10, while Resident Adviser called it "a tightly produced, fluid and euphoric listening experience". Billboard listed it as one of the ten electronic albums they were looking forward to, Mixmag called it one of the best albums of 2020 so far, and it was listed as #33 of Crack Magazines Top 50 Albums of 2020.

Katie has also been praised for her mixes as Roza Terenzi, with Red Bull and Pitchfork both listing her work as some of the best in 2020.

In December 2021 she released Pinky's Network, with Hame DJ on the Greenhouse compilation, followed in January 2022 byThird Nature a collaborative single with fellow Australian producer jd (Jack Doepel). She later released a collaborative album with D. Tiffany titled Edge Of Innocence.

Advocacy 
Katie has been vocal about her support for social movements. In summer of 2020, during the rise of the BLM movement, Katie took to Instagram to acknowledge the impact black culture has had on music and the fact that artists like her wouldn't be where they are without it. She also professed her solidarity to the indigenous peoples of Australia, the land where she grew up, and prompted fans to donate in support of these causes.

Discography 
Singles/EPs

Casual (2015) as Catlips

The "O.G." EP (2017)

Weakest Link (2018)

Glo With The Floooo (2019) as Gloworm

Stylish Tantrum (2020)

Third Nature (2022) with jd

Albums

Modern Bliss (2020)

Edge Of Innocence (2022) with D. Tiffany

Awards and nominations

External links

References 

Australian musicians
Living people
Year of birth missing (living people)